"When You're Looking Like That" is a song by Irish boy band Westlife from their second studio album, Coast to Coast (2000). It was released on 3 September 2001 as the sixth and final single from the album in Australia, Asia, Latin America, and mainland Europe. "When You're Looking Like That" peaked at number six in Denmark and was certified gold in Sweden by the International Federation of the Phonographic Industry (IFPI) for shipments of 15,000 copies.

Although being one of the more popular tracks in the UK and a music video being played regularly on UK music channels, the single was cancelled and was not released in the UK or Ireland and charted outside of top 100 in UK Singles Chart due to leakage only. It was released as a double A-side single with "Queen of My Heart" which was their ninth UK number-one. It was re-released in 2001 with its single remix included on the group's third studio album World of Our Own (2001). In 2019, the single charted in Ireland and peaked at number 20, giving Westlife their 28th top-20 hit in Ireland.

A Spanish version of the song, titled "Con lo bien que te ves" has also been recorded and can be found on their South African-only release, Released. The Spanish lyrics was written by Rudy Pérez.

Background
The song was written by a team of Swedish songwriters, Rami Yacoub, Andreas Carlsson, and Max Martin, and it was produced by Yacoub. It was composed in the traditional verse–chorus form in B major, with Shane Filan and Mark Feehily's vocal ranging from the chords of E4 to A5.

"When You're Looking Like That" along with "I Lay My Love on You" were not released in the United Kingdom. In an interview with Westlife, Feehily said that the main reason behind it was because they had not had as much exposure in Asia and Australia. It is their sixth-most-streamed song in the UK and appears in 20th place overall with 276,000 (as of 12 January 2019) units via streaming and downloads only.

Music video
The music video featured montage of their concerts, fans, autograph and album signings. Miss South Africa 2000 and Miss World 2001 Top 10 semifinalist Jo-Ann Strauss was featured in the video. This is their second video in 2001 to feature their fans and fifth video throughout their band career.

Track listings
 CD maxi-single
 "When You're Looking Like That" (single remix) – 3:52
 "Con lo bien que te ves" (single remix) (Spanish lyrics: Rudy Pérez) – 3:52
 "Don't Get Me Wrong" (Jake, Anders von Hofsten) – 3:43
 "I'll Be There" (Berry Gordy, Hal Davis, Willie Hutch, Bob West) – 3:54
 "When You're Looking Like That" (music video) – 4:00

 CD single
 "When You're Looking Like That" (single remix) – 3:52
 "Don't Get Me Wrong" – 3:43

Credits and personnel
Recording
 Recorded at Cheiron Studios, Stockholm, Sweden

Personnel
 Rami – songwriter, producer, engineer, mixing
 Andreas Carlsson – songwriter, backing vocals
 Max Martin – songwriter, backing vocals
 John Amatiello – engineer assistant, mixing assistant, Pro Tools engineer
 Esbjörn Öhrwall – guitar
 Björn Engelmann – mastering

Charts

Weekly charts

Year-end charts

Certifications

References

External links
 Official website

2000 songs
2001 singles
Westlife songs
RCA Records singles
Song recordings produced by Max Martin
Song recordings produced by Rami Yacoub
Songs written by Andreas Carlsson
Songs written by Max Martin
Songs written by Rami Yacoub
Sony BMG singles
Sony Music singles